Dundonald Road tram stop is a stop on the Tramlink service to the south of Wimbledon town centre, in the London Borough of Merton. Access is direct from the pavement on the north side of Dundonald Road at the site of the old level crossing (where the old, now demolished, signal box used to stand on the south side). 

At this point, the track follows the route of the old West Croydon to Wimbledon Line, although there was no station on the Dundonald Road site. 

The tram stop is near Dundonald Park and the Dundonald Primary School.

The stop was one of the 15 request stops on Tramlink until 15 December 2019 when it became a stop for all trams.

Gallery

References

Tramlink stops in the London Borough of Merton
Railway stations in Great Britain opened in 2000